Hanging Rock (also known as Mount Diogenes, Dryden's Rock, and to some of its traditional owners as Ngannelong) is a distinctive geological formation in central Victoria, Australia. A former volcano, it lies 718 m above sea level (105 m above plain level) on the plain between the two small townships of Newham and Hesket, approximately 70 km north-west of Melbourne and a few kilometres north of Mount Macedon.

In the middle of the 19th century, the traditional occupants of the place – tribes of the Dja Dja Wurrung, Woi Wurrung and Taungurung – were forced from it. They had been its occupants for thousands of years and, colonisation notwithstanding, have continued to maintain cultural and spiritual connections with the place.

To the settler colonialist society, Hanging Rock became a place for recreation and tourism. It came alternately under private, government, and mixed public-private control.

In the late 20th century, the area became very widely known as the setting of Joan Lindsay's novel Picnic at Hanging Rock.

Toponyms
Attempts to uncover Hanging Rock's Aboriginal name have proven difficult. Some think it is "Anneyelong" because of an inscription underneath an engraving of the rock made by German naturalist, William Blandowski, during an expedition in 1855–56. Historian and toponymist Ian D. Clark believes Blandowski misheard the name, and the word was possibly "Ngannelong" or something similar. The name "Diogenes Mount" was bestowed on the rock by the surveyor Robert Hoddle in 1843 in keeping with the spirit of several ancient Macedonian names given by Major Thomas Mitchell during his expedition through Victoria in 1836, which passed close to Hanging Rock. Others include Mount Macedon, Mount Alexander and the Campaspe River. Six other European names (Mount Diogenes, Diogenes' Head, Diogenes Monument, Dryden's Rock, Dryden's Monument and Hanging Rock) have also been recorded for the site.

Geology

 
Hanging Rock is a mamelon, created 6.25 million years ago by stiff magma pouring from a vent and congealing in place.  Often thought to be a volcanic plug, it is not.  Two other mamelons exist nearby, created in the same period: Camels Hump, to the south on Mount Macedon and, to the east, Crozier's Rocks. Alternative names for Crozier's Rocks are Brock's Monument, Alexander's Head and Mount Crystal.  All three mamelons are composed of soda trachyte. As Hanging Rock's magma cooled and contracted it split into rough columns.  These weathered over time into the many pinnacles that can be seen today.

The significance of these three mamelons demonstrates the mechanism of plate tectonics.  As the Australian Plate moved northwards towards East Asia, over a period of 27 million years it passed over a volcanic hotspot. This resulted in a chain of volcanoes stretching from Hillsborough (33 million years ago) in Northern Queensland  to Hanging Rock (6.5 million years ago) which is part of the southernmost end of this volcanic activity.  This chain also includes the Warrumbungles (New South Wales, 15.5 million years ago) and the Glass House Mountains (Southern Queensland, 24.3 million years ago). These volcanoes all have the same chemical composition.

Hanging Rock contains numerous distinctive rock formations, including the "Hanging Rock" itself (a boulder suspended between other boulders, under which is the main entrance path), the Colonnade, the Eagle and the UFO. The highest point on Hanging Rock is 718 metres above sea level and 105 metres above the plain below.

Traditional owners and colonisation 

At the time of colonisation, the traditional occupants had lived around Hanging Rock for more than 26,000 years. The Rock was woven into the fabric of the culture of the traditional owners. However, they were forcibly displaced from the area. Jason Tamiru has expressed a Yung Balug perspective on this history:The truth is my people were hit hard during the frontier wars. The Western region is known to us as the Killing Fields. The naming of the Rock is with all those that come in my dreams. Australia is starting to learn that there is a black history in this country that needs to be acknowledged and celebrated.Long before the 1967 novel, 1975 film and the naming of Hanging Rock, Tribes of the Dja Dja Wurrung, Woi Wurrung and Taungurung would gather at that location for important Men’s Ceremony.This is a place where big business was held: Corrobborees, Initiation Ceremonies, Songline Ceremonies, trade and relationship building and a place where laws were made and passed.According to Tamiru, Ngannelong continues to play a role in Yung Balug culture:The mystique and spiritual essence of the rock has contributed to the story of our Dreaming which binds my people to our creator spirits and country.We Sing, Dance and Paint our Country forever.Settler colonialists dispossessed the Aboriginal owners and forced them out of the area. "One of the last initiation ceremonies may have been held there in November 1851 by a Wurundjeri elder from the Templestowe area" in the Yarra Valley. This ceremony was also attended by two young settlers' children, Willie Chivers, 11, and his younger brother Tom, 7, who were being cared for on a daily basis by the tribe after their mother had died. Their father went missing after looking for their mother.

An engraving made by William Blandowski in 1855/56 shows a group of Aboriginal people camped on the hillside. Another engraving by Robert Bruce published in an 1865 edition of The Illustrated Melbourne Post shows three Aboriginal figures in the foreground with Hanging Rock rising up in the background.

Community
Horse races have been held at Hanging Rock for over one hundred years; the Hanging Rock Racing Club holds two race meetings a year on New Year's Day and Australia Day (26 January).

The Friends of Hanging Rock, established in 1987, is a community group which holds events open to the public, such as planting days and wildlife tours.

In 2013, the Hanging Rock Action Group was formed by local residents to call for adequate community consultation about the Macedon Ranges Shire Council's proposal to build a 200-person conference centre and 100 bed hotel in the Eastern Paddock, adjacent to and very visible from the Rock.  The anger by the local community over this issue led to 7 of 9 councillors being voted out in the following elections.

Hanging Rock is the centrepiece for the Hanging Rock Recreation Reserve, a public reserve managed by the Macedon Ranges Shire Council.  The reserve includes a horse racing track, picnic grounds, creek, interpretation centre and cafe. The reserve is a habitat for endemic flora and fauna, including koalas, wallabies, possums, phascogales, wedge-tailed eagles and kookaburras.

There is also a "Picnic at Hanging Rock" costumed event held in February around Valentines Day, organized by Central Highlands Victorian Historical Group.  Participants dress in Victorian or Edwardian attire and picnic at the base before climbing the Rock for photo opportunities.

The reserve is open to the public during daylight hours seven days a week. Entry is charged per vehicle. Camping is possible by arrangement.

Hanging Rock Reserve is listed on the Victorian Heritage Register as a place of historical, aesthetic and social significance to the State of Victoria.

Hanging Rock Reserve is currently under review by the Department of Environment, Land, Water and Planning to determine future governance and administrative arrangements for management of the site.

Treatments in novel and film

Hanging Rock was the inspiration and setting for the novel Picnic at Hanging Rock, written by Joan Lindsay and published in 1967. The novel dealt with the disappearance of a number of schoolgirls during a visit to the site. 

The popularity of the novel meant several adaptations in film, theatre, radio and television were made, with the 1975 film Picnic at Hanging Rock directed by Peter Weir as the most prominent example. The success of the film was responsible for a substantial increase in visits to the rock and a renewal of interest in the novel.

Concert venue
Hanging Rock reserve is currently used as an occasional outdoor concert venue by major international acts on the Australian leg of their tours.

The following events have taken place at Hanging Rock as part of a trial by Frontier Touring and the Macedon Ranges Shire Council:

 Leonard Cohen – November 2010 
 Rod Stewart – February 2012  
 Bruce Springsteen – March 2013 (Wrecking Ball tour)

In 2014, the Rolling Stones were scheduled to play a night concert (30 March) at Hanging Rock as part of their "14 On Fire" tour.  The death of Mick Jagger's partner, L'Wren Scott, resulted in the postponement of the entire tour. The tour was rescheduled and resumed in Adelaide on October 25, 2014. The Hanging Rock concert was rescheduled to take place on Saturday, November 8, 2014, but Rolling Stones lead Mick Jagger cancelled the concert due to a throat infection.

In October 2013, Frontier Touring signed a five-year agreement with the Macedon Ranges Shire Council to hold up to four concerts per year at Hanging Rock, effective from 31 October 2014.

Subsequent concerts have been:
 The Eagles – February 2015 (History of the Eagles)
 Rod Stewart – March 2015
 Cold Chisel – November 2015
 Ed Sheeran – February 2017
 Bruce Springsteen – February 2017
 Midnight Oil – November 2017
 Elton John – January 2020 (Farewell Yellow Brick Road)
 Nick Cave and Warren Ellis – November 2022

Gallery

See also

 List of mountains in Victoria

References

External links

 
Hanging Rock Action Group

Victorian Heritage Register
Rock formations of Victoria (Australia)
Mountains of Victoria (Australia)
Dja Dja Wurrung
Volcanoes of Victoria (Australia)
Pliocene volcanoes